Kazakhstan participated in the Turkvision Song Contest 2013 in Eskişehir, Turkey.

Before Turkvision

National final 
Kazakhstan organised a national final held on 24 November 2013 to select their entry for the contest. The selection was broadcast live on Astana TV. 16 artists and songs participated in the selection, and the winner was decided by SMS voting. The contest was won by the song "Birlikpen alǵa", composed by Batır Baynazarov, written by Serjan Bakıtjan and performed by Rin'go.

Artist and song information

Rin'go
Rin'go is a Kazakhstani pop group, consisting of members Batır Baynazarov, Daniyar Otegen, Ayan Birbaev, and Adiljan Umarov. The group represented Kazakhstan in the Turkvision Song Contest 2013 with the song "Birlikpen alǵa". They represented Kazakhstan in New Wave 2007, held in Jūrmala, Latvia, placing 4th with 302 points, and represented Kazakhstan in the 2011 edition of Crimea Music Fest. In 2014, the group won the "Astana's star" award in the "Best men's group" category.

At Turkvision

Semi-final
Kazakhstan performed 11th in the semi-final on 19 December 2013, and qualified for the final.

Final
Kazakhstan performed 4th in the final on 21 December 2013, placing 9th in a field of 12 countries with 178 points.

After Turkvision
At a press conference in Almaty on 25 December 2013, Rin'go and producer Alua Konorova expressed their dissatisfaction with the voting mechanism, criticising the lack of SMS voting and the use of juries from outside the world of showbusiness, and with the "poor" quality of the technical equipment. Kazakhstan had considered appealing the results, but ultimately did not do so.

References

Countries in the Turkvision Song Contest 2013
2013
Turkvision